The 2013 Canada Open Grand Prix was the eighth grand prix gold and grand prix tournament of the 2013 BWF Grand Prix Gold and Grand Prix. The tournament was held in Richmond Olympic Oval, Richmond, Canada July 16 until July 21, 2013 and had a total purse of $50,000.

Men's singles

Seeds

  Kazumasa Sakai (third round)
  Eric Pang (final)
  Tan Chun Seang (champion)
  Kento Momota (withdrew)
  Ramdan Misbun (semi-final)
  Suppanyu Avihingsanon (third round)
  Misha Zilberman (withdrew)
  Henri Hurskainen (semi-final)
  Zulfadli Zulkiffli (third round)
  Joachim Persson (third round)
  Sattawat Pongnairat (quarter-final)
  Riichi Takeshita (quarter-final)
  Ashton Chen Yong Zhao (quarter-final)
  Arvind Bhat (third round)
  Petr Koukal (second round)
  Michael Lahnsteiner (third round)

Finals

Top half

Section 1

Section 2

Section 3

Section 4

Bottom half

Section 5

Section 6

Section 7

Section 8

Women's singles

Seeds

  Nichaon Jindapon (champion)
  Sapsiree Taerattanachai (second round)
  Yip Pui Yin (final)
  Carolina Marin (semi-final)
  Yui Hashimoto (quarter-final)
  Chan Tsz Ka (quarter-final)
  Kaori Imabeppu (quarter-final)
  Beatriz Corrales (second round)

Finals

Top half

Section 1

Section 2

Bottom half

Section 3

Section 4

Men's doubles

Maneepong Jongjit and his former partner, Bodin Issara, had a brawl during the change of ends during the men's doubles final between Jongjit, partnered with Nipitphon Puangpuapech, and Issara and his new partner, Pakkawat Vilailak. 

The former partners who had unresolved issues with each other,  verbally abused each other during the first game, being warned by the umpire. The abuse continued at the end of the game, leading Issara to chase Jongit across the arena. 

In an act of self-defense while running away from Issara, Jongit swung his racquet and hit Issara in the side of the head, which left Issara bleeding from his right ear and requiring stitches, before Issara caught up with Jongit - who fell to the floor on the adjacent court - and began hitting, punching and kicking him. The two were eventually broken up by Issara's partner and their coach before police and security intervened. 

After the fight, the tournament referee showed Issara and Vilailak  a black card, meaning they were ejected from the tournament, which was awarded to Jongjit and Puangpuapech.

Both Issara and Jongjit received sanctions from the Badminton World Federation and from the Badminton Association of Thailand: Issara, who was deemed to be the instigator and more physically abusive, was banned for two years from participating in any international tournaments, while Jongjit, who had provoked Issara during the match, was banned for three months.

Seeds

  Takeshi Kamura / Keigo Sonoda (quarter-final)
  Maneepong Jongjit / Nipitphon Puangpuapech (champion)
  Hiroyuki Saeki / Ryota Taohata (withdrew)
  Phillip Chew / Sattawat Pongnairat (second round)
  Ruud Bosch / Koen Ridder (semi-final)
  Adrian Liu / Derrick Ng (quarter-final)
  Jacco Arends / Jelle Maas (first round)
  Bodin Issara / Pakkawat Vilailak (Disqualified)

Finals

Top half
Section 1

Section 2

Bottom half
Section 3

Section 4

Women's doubles
Seeds

  Wang Rong / Zhang Zhibo (semi-final)  Eva Lee / Paula Lynn Obanana (quarter-final)  Alex Bruce / Phyllis Chan (quarter-final)  Grace Gao / Michelle Li (semi-final)Finals

Top half
Section 1

Section 2

Bottom half
Section 3

Section 4

Mixed doubles
Seeds

  Lee Chun Hei / Chau Hoi Wah (champion)
  Phillip Chew / Jamie Subandhi (quarter-final)  Jorrit de Ruiter / Samantha Barning (final)  Jelle Maas / Iris Tabeling (second round)''

Finals

Top half

Section 1

Section 2

Bottom half

Section 3

Section 4

References

Canadian Open (badminton)
Canada Open Grand Prix
Canada Open Grand Prix
Sports competitions in British Columbia
BWF Grand Prix Gold and Grand Prix